Overman is a 2015 South Korean film directed by Seo Eun-Young and starring Kim Jung-hyun and Chae Seo-jin. The film had its world premiere on October 2, 2015 at the Busan International Film Festival.

Plot
High school gymnast Do-hyun (Kim Jung-hyun) is ordered to perform community service as a punishment for fighting. While serving as a library assistant, he meets Soo-hyun (Chae Seo-jin), a schoolgirl who borrows a lot of books. Finding her attractive, he talks to her and they gradually grow closer. This love between a teenage boy and girl looks cheerful enough, but they are both suffering in their own way. Each of them face new choices. It's a teenage love story and coming-of-age film in which the bright and wholesome protagonists bring joy throughout.

Cast
Kim Jung-hyun as Do-Hyun
Chae Seo-jin  as Soo-Hyun
Seo Young-Hwa as Yeon-Hee
Lee Chae-kyung as Psychiatrist
Myung Gye-Nam as teacher
Kim Min-Seok as Min-Sik

Film Festival
The film world premiered at the 2015 (20th) Busan International Film Festival where it was screened from October 1–10 and it was awarded for "promoting independent cinema" according to The Hollywood Reporter.

References

External links
 
 Overman at the Korean Film Council

2015 films